Lenore Carol Blum (née Epstein, born December 18, 1942) is an American computer scientist and mathematician who has made pioneering contributions to the theories of real number computation, cryptography, and pseudorandom number generation. She was a distinguished career professor of computer science at Carnegie Mellon University until 2019 and is currently a professor in residence at the University of California, Berkeley. She is also known for her efforts to increase diversity in mathematics and computer science.

Early life and education 
Blum was born to a Jewish family in New York City, where her mother was a science teacher. They moved to Venezuela when Blum was nine.
After graduating from her Venezuelan high school at age 16, she studied architecture at Carnegie Institute of Technology (now Carnegie Mellon University) beginning in 1959. With the assistance of Alan Perlis, she shifted fields to mathematics in 1960. She married Manuel Blum, then a student at the Massachusetts Institute of Technology, and transferred in 1961 to Simmons College, a private women's liberal arts college in Boston. Simmons did not have a strong mathematics program but she was eventually able to take Isadore Singer's mathematics classes at MIT, graduating from Simmons with a B.S. in mathematics in 1963.

She received her Ph.D. in mathematics from the Massachusetts Institute of Technology in 1968.   Her dissertation, Generalized Algebraic Theories: A Model Theoretic Approach, was supervised by Gerald Sacks. She had switched to being advised by Sacks after being unable to follow an earlier advisor in his move to Princeton University because, at the time, Princeton did not accept female graduate students.

Career 
After completing her doctorate, Blum went to the University of California at Berkeley to work with Julia Robinson as a postdoctoral fellow and lecturer in mathematics.
However, the department had no permanent positions for women, and after two years, her position as lecturer was not renewed. In 1971 she became one of the founders of the Association for Women in Mathematics.
In 1973 she joined the faculty of Mills College, a women's college in the Oakland hills near Berkeley. In 1974 she founded the mathematics and computer science department at Mills, at that time the only computer science program at a women's college. She served as the head or co-head of the department for 13 years. From 1975 to 1978 she served as the third president of the Association for Women in Mathematics. In 1979 she was awarded an endowed professorship, the first Letts-Villard Chair at Mills.

In 1983 Blum won a National Science Foundation Visiting Professorship for Women award to work with Michael Shub for two years at the CUNY Graduate Center.
In 1987 she spent a year at IBM.
In 1992 Blum became the deputy director of the Mathematical Sciences Research Institute (MSRI), working there with its director William Thurston.  After visiting the City University of Hong Kong in 1996–1998 to work on her book Complexity and Real Computation (during Hong Kong's handover from British to Chinese rule), she became a Distinguished Career Professor of Computer Science at Carnegie Mellon University (CMU) in 1999.

At CMU, she took the philosophy that the low numbers of women majoring in computer science were in part caused by a vicious cycle: because there were few women, the women in computer science had fewer support networks (such as friends in the same major to help them with coursework) than men. And because these factors made being a computer scientist less pleasant and more difficult for the women, fewer women chose to major in computer science. Instead of the then-popular approach of changing the curriculum to be more application-centric in the hope of attracting women, she pushed to maintain a traditional computer science program but to change the culture surrounding the program to be more welcoming. In support of this goal, she founded the Women@SCS program at CMU, which provided both mentoring and outreach opportunities for women in computer science.
Through this program, which came to be directed by Blum's student Carol Frieze, CMU was able to increase the proportion of women in the undergraduate computer science program to nearly 50%.

Blum also founded Project Olympus at CMU, a business incubator program that led to many startups in Pittsburgh associated with CMU and its computer program.
She resigned from CMU in 2018 (effective August 2019) after a change in management structure of Project Olympus led to sexist treatment of her and the exclusion of other women from project activities.

Research
The Blum Blum Shub pseudorandom number generator, published jointly by Blum, Manuel Blum, and Michael Shub, is based on the operation of squaring numbers modulo the products of two large primes. Its security can be reduced to the computational hardness assumption that integer factorization is infeasible.

Blum is also known for the Blum–Shub–Smale machine, a theoretical model of computation over the real numbers. Blum and her co-authors, Michael Shub and Stephen Smale, showed that (analogously to the theory of Turing machines) one can define analogues of NP-completeness, undecidability, and universality for this model. For instance, in this model it is undecidable to determine whether a given point belongs to the Mandelbrot set. She published a book on the subject, and in 1990 she gave an address at the International Congress of Mathematicians on computational complexity theory and real computation.

Recognition
In 2002, Blum was selected to be an Association for Women in Mathematics Noether Lecturer.

In 2005, Blum was a recipient of the Presidential Award for Excellence in Science, Mathematics, and Engineering Mentoring, given by president George W. Bush "for her efforts to mentor girls and women in technology fields where traditionally they are underrepresented". She was given the Simmons University 2018 Distinguished Alumnae Lifetime Achievement Award in 2018.

Blum was elected as a Fellow of the American Association for the Advancement of Science in 1979.
In 2012, Blum became a fellow of the American Mathematical Society.  In 2017 she was selected as a fellow of the Association for Women in Mathematics in the inaugural class.

She is included in a deck of playing cards featuring notable women mathematicians published by the Association of Women in Mathematics.

Personal life 
Lenore Blum is married to Manuel Blum and is the mother of Avrim Blum.  All three have been MIT alumni and professors of Computer Science at Carnegie Mellon.

Selected publications

References

External links
Lenore Blum's Home Page

Living people
1942 births
20th-century American mathematicians
21st-century American mathematicians
American computer scientists
Women mathematicians
American women computer scientists
Theoretical computer scientists
Simmons University alumni
Massachusetts Institute of Technology School of Science alumni
Mills College faculty
University of California, Berkeley College of Letters and Science faculty
Carnegie Mellon University faculty
Fellows of the American Association for the Advancement of Science
Fellows of the American Mathematical Society
Fellows of the Association for Women in Mathematics
21st-century American women